Tsofkara (also, Soof-curra, T'sof-ka-ra, Tuck-a-soof-curra, and Witsogo) is a former Karok settlement in Humboldt County, California. It was located above Chinits on the east bank of the Klamath River nearly halfway between Orleans Bar and the Salmon River. In 1852 it consisted of nine houses.

References

Former settlements in Humboldt County, California
Former Native American populated places in California
Karuk villages
Lost Native American populated places in the United States